Anić is a Croatian and Serbian surname. The surname may refer to:

 Ante (Antun) Anić (1876–1953), Croatian writer and politician
 Antonela Anić (born 1985), Croatian basketball player
 Boško Anić (born 1968), Croatian footballer
 Damir Anić (1944-1992), Croatian gymnast
 Darko Anić (chess player) (b. 1957), Croatian chess grandmaster
 Darko Anić (footballer) (b. 1974), retired Serbian football player
 Franka Anić (b. 1991), Slovenian-Croatian taekwondo athlete
 Igor Anić (born 1987), French handball player
 Jelka Anić (Zagozda) (1859–1923), Croatian opera singer and actress
 Jelka Anić (b. 1921), Croatian agronomist
 Josip Anić (Zagozda) (1859–1933), Croatian actor and director
 Lazar Anić (born 1991), Serbian long jumper
 Maja Anić (b. 1988), Croatian rower
 Mića (Mićo, Milan) Anić Perišin (1889–1932), Croatian poet and politician
 Milan Anić (1906–1968), Croatian forestry expert
 Vladimir Anić (1930–2000), Croatian linguist and lexicographer
 Dr Petar Anic (1927–1990), Croatian economist, one of the founders of Osijek University and its first Rector

Croatian surnames
Serbian surnames